The water polo competition in the 2009 Summer Universiade are due to be held at different venues in Serbia between 1–12 July 2009.

Men

Women

External links

 
2009 Summer Universiade
Universiade
2009
2009